Conflict: Middle East Political Simulator is a turn-based government simulation game designed by David J. Eastman and published by Virgin Mastertronic in 1990 for DOS, Atari ST and Amiga (with extended graphics). The game is available for free download at abandonware sites.

The game is set in 1997. The Prime Minister of Israel has just been assassinated, leaving the player to run the country. The player's objective is to cause the defeat of the neighbouring four states, either by invasion (not necessarily by Israel, as the other states can and do invade each other) or political destabilisation.

Gameplay

Reception
Alan Emrich reviewed the game for Computer Gaming World, and stated that "Conflict is not striving to be a realistic simulation. It is meant to be an amusing exercise in cold war politics set in a futuristic Middle East environment. It is fast playing, easy to learn, entertaining and not to be taken too seriously."

In a 1994 survey of war games, Computer Gaming World gave Conflict three stars out of five, stating that it was "Quick and fun to play" but not compatible with faster computers. (It can be run today using DOSBox.)

References

External links 
 Conflict: Middle East Political Simulator at the Internet Archive
 Conflict: Middle East Political Simulator - site from the designer

1990 video games
Amiga games
Atari ST games
DOS games
Government simulation video games
Video games set in 1997
Video games set in the Middle East
Virgin Interactive games
Computer wargames
Video games developed in the United Kingdom